The 1976 Cronulla-Sutherland Sharks season was the 10th in the club's history. They competed in the NSWRFL's 1976 Premiership as well as the 1976 Amco Cup.

Ladder

References

Cronulla-Sutherland Sharks seasons
Cronulla-Sutherland Sharks season